Djouroutou is a town in south-western Ivory Coast. It is a sub-prefecture of Tabou Department in San-Pédro Region, Bas-Sassandra District. The town is 11 kilometres east of the border with Liberia.

A large portion of the north-eastern area of the sub-prefecture lies within Taï National Park.

Djouroutou was a commune until March 2012, when it became one of 1126 communes nationwide that were abolished.

In 2014, the population of the sub-prefecture of Djouroutou was 71,651.

Villages
The seventeen villages of the sub-prefecture of Djouroutou and their population in 2014 are:

References

Sub-prefectures of San-Pédro Region
Former communes of Ivory Coast